Galani is a community in the municipality Topeiros in the Xanthi regional unit of Greece. The community consists of the settlements Galani, Ano Livera, Kato Livera and Imera, all on the left bank of the river Nestos. 

Populated places in Xanthi (regional unit)